The Du clan of Jingzhao was a prominent Chinese clan, centred around the Jingzhao region (modern day Xi'an). Tracing its origins back to the Western Han dynasty, it retained its prominence in Chinese politics and society up to the end of the Tang dynasty.

History

Han dynasty

The Du clan can be traced to Du Zhou (d. 94 BC), who served as a censor in the Western Han dynasty under Emperor Wu of Han, and his son Du Yannian, who also served as a chief censor and shifted the clan's base to Duling (in modern-day Xi'an). After this, however, the Du family appears not to be deeply involved in politics during the Eastern Han.

Three Kingdoms Period and Jin dynasty
The Du family regained prominence in government during the late Han period with Du Ji, who came to the attention of Cao Caovia Xun Yu and became a renowned governor of Hedong Commandery (modern day southern Shanxi). His son, Du Shu, also became a regional governor, and Du Shu's son Du Yu became the chief commander of the conquest of Wu by Jin.

In the wake of the Disaster of Yongjia, when the Western Jin capital at Luoyang was sacked, the Du clan generally did not embark on the southern migration to the Eastern Jin that was undertaken by many other prominent clans, instead choosing to remain in northern China and to serve the succeeding non-Chinese regimes. They retained their prominence even during the tumultuous period of the Five Barbarians, and are reported as filling important military and political posts after moving east into Later Zhao.

An exception to the trend of remaining north was Du Yi (杜乂), who achieved fame as an elegant gentleman in the Eastern Jin court, but died without issue.

Tang dynasty

During the Tang dynasty, members of the Du clan played an important role in both governance and culture. The Tongdian, an encyclopedic account of governmental institutions through to the An–Shi Rebellion, was compiled by Du You.

Prominent members

Du Yu (222–285), general of Cao Wei and Jin and the conqueror of Eastern Wu
Du Ruhui (585–630), chancellor under Emperor Taizong of Tang
Du Fu (712–770), Tang dynasty poet
Du You (735–812), Tang dynasty chancellor
Du Mu (803–852), Tang dynasty poet, grandson of Du You

References

 
Chinese clans